Adrian Pillajo (born 7 July 1991) is an Ecuadorian long-distance runner.

In 2018, he competed in the men's half marathon at the 2018 IAAF World Half Marathon Championships held in Valencia, Spain. He finished in 137th place.

References

External links 
 

Living people
1991 births
Place of birth missing (living people)
Ecuadorian male long-distance runners